Cheng Huan, QC, SC (born 1947, Teluk Intan, Malaysia) is a prominent barrister in Hong Kong.

References

1947 births
Living people
Hong Kong legal professionals
People from Perak
Date of birth missing (living people)